Gallowstree Common is a hamlet in South Oxfordshire, England, about  north of Reading, Berkshire. The village had a public house, the Reformation, which was controlled by the Brakspear brewery. The brewery sold the pub garden for housing and the pub is to be turned into a vet's surgery. The village has two woods: New Copse to the north and Withy Copse to the west.

References

 List of places in Oxfordshire

External links

Villages in Oxfordshire
South Oxfordshire District